Elbridge Baker Ross Jr. (August 2, 1909 – November 13, 1980) was an American ice hockey player who competed in the 1936 Winter Olympics. He was born in Melrose, Massachusetts and died in Saint Petersburg, Florida. In 1936 he was a member of the United States men's national ice hockey team, which won the bronze medal at the 1936 Winter Olympics.

External links
 
 profile

1909 births
1980 deaths
American men's ice hockey forwards
Colby College alumni
Ice hockey players from Massachusetts
Ice hockey players at the 1936 Winter Olympics
Medalists at the 1936 Winter Olympics
Olympic bronze medalists for the United States in ice hockey
People from Melrose, Massachusetts
Sportspeople from Middlesex County, Massachusetts